Do You Feel is The Rocket Summer's third full-length album, released on July 17, 2007 through Island Records. On this album, Bryce Avary incorporates more diverse instrumentation, including saxophone.

Initially available on MySpace on July 10, the entire album was leaked onto the Internet on July 13. Following its release, the album debuted at number 44 on the U.S. Billboard 200, selling about 15,000 copies in its first week.

The music video for "Do You Feel" featured the band performing as a quartet, and also features Josh Farro of Novel American and formerly of Paramore and Jeremy Davis of Paramore, Andrew McMahon of Jack's Mannequin, Matt Thiessen of Relient K, Ian Crawford and Cash Colligan formerly of The Cab, Forrest Kline of Hellogoodbye, Mike Herrera of MxPx, Alex Gaskarth of All Time Low, and Jonathan Cook of Forever The Sickest Kids.

Track listing

Personnel
The Rocket Summer
Bryce Avary – vocals, guitar, bass, cello, drums, piano, percussion, organ, wurlitzer, synthesizers, harmonica, production

Additional personnel
Jim Wirt – production, bass on track 12
C. J. Eriksson – recording engineering
Chris Lord-Alge – mixing
Ted Jensen – mastering
Graham Hope – engineering
Max Coane – engineering
Sam Holland – engineering
Neil Couser – engineering
Chris Mullings – engineering
Keith Armstrong – mixing
Steve Madaio – trumpet on tracks 2 and 6
Martin Gregg – saxophone on tracks 2 and 6
Nicholas Lane – trombone on tracks 2 and 6
Patrick Warren – chamberlin on tracks 10 and 13

Charts

References

External links 
 The Rocket Summer Official Site
 The Rocket Summer Official Myspace Page

2007 albums
The Rocket Summer albums

fr:Calendar Days